Parabathymyrus fijiensis is an eel in the family Congridae (conger/garden eels). It was described by Emma Stanislavovna Karmovskaya in 2004. It is a marine, deep water-dwelling eel which is known from Fiji (from which its species epithet is derived), in the western Pacific Ocean. It dwells at a depth range of 478–500 metres. Females can reach a total length of 36 centimetres.

References

Congridae
Fish described in 2004